Open Web Analytics (OWA) is  open-source web analytics software created by Peter Adams. OWA is written in PHP and uses a MySQL database, which makes it compatible for running with an AMP solution stack on various web servers.

Information
OWA is comparable to Google Analytics, though OWA is server software anyone can install and run on their own host, while Google Analytics is a software service offered by Google. OWA supports tracking with WordPress and MediaWiki, two popular web site frameworks. This application helps webmasters keep track of and observe the influx of views on their websites.  The program also tracks the websites of competitors and their company's growth compared to the site in question.

References

External links

Web software
Web analytics
Free web analytics software
Free software programmed in PHP
WordPress